South Yankton is a populated place in Cedar County, Nebraska, United States, located just south of Yankton, South Dakota on U.S. Route 81. Gavins Point Dam is located four miles west of South Yankton on Nebraska Highway 121.

References 

Unincorporated communities in Cedar County, Nebraska
Unincorporated communities in Nebraska